Forest Lane station is a DART Light Rail station in Dallas, Texas. It is located on Forest Lane, just east of US 75 (North Central Expressway) in North Dallas.

References

External links
 DART - Forest Lane Station

Dallas Area Rapid Transit light rail stations in Dallas
Railway stations in the United States opened in 2002
2002 establishments in Texas
Railway stations in Dallas County, Texas